The Mystery of the Secret Room (1945) is the third in the Five Find-Outers series of the children's novels by Enid Blyton. Illustrated by Joseph Abbey, it was published by Methuen.

Plot

Fatty is made the leader of the Five Find Outers, as he explains that he has been studying how to get out of a locked room when the key is not on his side, to write letters with invisible ink (or orange/lemon juice) and has been practising disguises.

The Five have fun with Fatty's new techniques, particularly disguises. Pip disguises himself with a wig and some sticking out teeth and attracts the attention of Mr Goon, who chases him across the village. In an attempt to escape Mr Goon, Pip runs into the grounds of an empty house and climbs a tree. He is very surprised to see a fully furnished room at the top of an otherwise empty and apparently abandoned house. The Find Outers get to work to discover who owns Milton House, and why there is an apparently secret room. Who uses it and why?

The children trace the owner of the house to the blandly named "John Henry Smith", who lives in a distant town. Fatty telephones Mr Smith and alerts him to the fact that someone knows about the secret room. Expecting the mysterious Mr Smith to come to Peterswood and check out what is happening at Milton House, Fatty disguises himself with his wig and teeth and goes to the house at midnight. He manages to get inside and discovers a notebook written in code in the secret room. However, he is captured by the men - who are foreigners - and forced to write a letter to the other children, to trap them inside the house. Fatty writes a note, but he writes another, secret note in invisible ink, warning the children and telling them to call the police. Luckily, Bets notices that Fatty's note smells of oranges - orange juice was used as the secret ink - and the others realise the danger Fatty is in, and telephone their favourite policeman, Inspector Jenks. Meanwhile, Fatty escapes from a locked room and manages to meet Inspector Jenks outside the house and hand him the code book. The police round up the villains - international thieves - and all is well.

External links
 

Enid Blyton Society page

1945 British novels
Novels by Enid Blyton
Methuen Publishing books
Children's mystery novels
1945 children's books